The men's 3000 metres steeplechase at the 2019 World Athletics Championships was held at the Khalifa International Stadium in Doha from 1 to 4 October 2019.

Summary
Kenya considers the steeplechase to be their national sport.  With defending champion Conseslus Kipruto, they qualified four to the final.  the USA, with two Kenyan ex-pats and Ethiopia, also qualified all three of their entrants.  This was only the second major championship since 2007 without perennial medalist Mahiedine Mekhissi-Benabbad.  Kipruto almost didn't make it.  A stress fracture in April would sideline him for months, but he builds a primitive swimming pool at his home in Mosoriot Kenya to do aqua training until he could run again.

While they are a neighboring long-distance running rival, Ethiopia does not have the same successful track record in the steeplechase, but was encouraged by Getnet Wale winning the 2019 IAAF Diamond League.  Here the Ethiopians took to the lead.  Chala Beyo took the point first with Wale ,and Kipruto pushing the pace out front.  After two laps, Wale took over.  Beyo would not finish.  Starting slower, Lamecha Girma ran in the middle of the pack for a while before moving forward to take over leading duties for the team.  The fast pace dropped off many of the runners, the lead pack dwindling to the entire Kenyan team, Hillary Bor, Djilali Bedrani, returning silver medalist Soufiane El Bakkali, Wale and Girma.  With two laps to go, Kipruto moved out to the lead and looked around for his teammates to join him, but help did not come forward.  Instead, Wale moved ahead again and El Bakkali planted himself on Kipruto's shoulder.  As the pace increased, the other three Kenyan's fell off the back of the pack.  Bedrani and Bor were the next to go.  It was a four-man group at the bell with Girma on the tail end.  Through the penultimate turn, El Bakkali took the lead.  For most of the last decade, the steeplechase was decided by a devastating move off the first barrier on the backstretch, usually by Ezekiel Kemboi.  It is where Kipruto won the race in 2017 and the Olympics in 2016.  Here, coming off the barrier, Kipruto gained a couple of feet on Wale but El Bakkali remained in command.  Instead, Girma ran around the group and into the lead.  Kipruto tried to react, passing El Bakkali over the water jump.  Wale had no answer for the speed and the medalists were decided.  Going into the final barrier, Girma opened up two metres on Kipruto.  Coming off the barrier, Kipruto launched into a sprint gaining slightly on Girma.  Desperately looking for the finish Girma dipped a little early, Kipruto dipped like a seasoned professional hurdler.  In the photo finish, Kipruto took the gold by .01.  18-year-old Girma got the consolation prize of the Ethiopian national record that 19-year-old Wale had improved twice already in 2019.

Records
Before the competition records were as follows:

Qualification standard
The standard to qualify automatically for entry was 8:29.00.

Schedule
The event schedule, in local time (UTC+3), was as follows:

Results

Heats
The first three in each heat (Q) and the next six fastest (q) qualified for the final.

Final
The final was started on 4 October at 21:45.

References

Steeplechase
Steeplechase at the World Athletics Championships